Darlington Historic District is a national historic district at Darlington, Harford County, Maryland, United States. It includes approximately 100 small-scale structures in the village of Darlington.  They include four churches including the Darlington United Methodist Church and the Deer Creek Friends Meetinghouse, a dozen shops and stores, barns/garages, meathouses, chicken houses, and other outbuildings, a lodge hall, a grammar school, a cemetery, and three working farms.  They date particularly from the late 19th century through the early 20th century.

It was added to the National Register of Historic Places in 1987.

Gallery

References

External links
, including photo dated 2000, at Maryland Historical Trust
Boundary Map of the Darlington Historic District, Harford County, at Maryland Historical Trust

Historic districts in Harford County, Maryland
Historic districts on the National Register of Historic Places in Maryland
National Register of Historic Places in Harford County, Maryland